Gorgones ke Manges (Mermaids and Rascals) is a 1968 film starring Mary Chronopoulou.

Plot 
Rumours have it that a Swiss company is making investment plans to develop a Greek island. A couple of Athenian entrepreneurs rush to the island to buy land and flip it for profit. The Athenian couple, a race-car driver and an actress, meet the resistance of the island's grand old lady who does not wish to sell land to outsiders. The business plans eventually fail to materialise but romance ensues between the actress and the son of the lady as well as the race-car driver and a local girl. The film has references to ancient Greek tragedy and contains elements from it such as a chorus.

Cast 
Mary Chronopoulou ..... Flora
Phaedon Georgitsis ..... Petros Athanasiou
Martha Karagianni ..... Marina
Nora Valsami ..... Nokilas's fiancee
Giannis Vogiatzis ..... Panagis
Lakis Komninos ..... Iasonas
Dionysis Papagiannopoulos ..... Athanasiou
Chronis Exarhakos ..... Gripis
Maria Foka ..... mistress
Vangelis Seilinos ..... Nikolas
Christos Doxaras ..... Dimitros
Kia Bozou ..... Petros's friend
Mary Halkia ..... Petros's friend

Release 
The film premiered in Greece on 2 December 1968.

External links

References 

1968 comedy films
1968 films
Greek comedy films
Films set in Greece
Finos Film films
1960s Greek-language films
Films directed by Giannis Dalianidis